Leckhampton Hill and Charlton Kings Common is a  biological and geological Site of Special Scientific Interest in Gloucestershire, notified in 1954.  There are five units of assessment.

The site is listed in the 'Cotswold District' Local Plan 2001-2011 (on line) as a Key Wildlife Site (KWS).

Location
The site is in the Cotswold Area of Outstanding Natural Beauty and is one of a series of unimproved Jurassic limestone grassland area which are located along the Cotswold scarp. It is south of Cheltenham and near the communities of Leckhampton and Charlton Kings, and has a north-facing aspect.  The site also includes disused quarry faces, and quarry spoil which has been vegetated.

Geology
The Leckhampton quarries expose the thickest single cross-section through the Middle Jurassic, Inferior Oolite strata of the area.  They are a major research interest, and there are many published accounts of the last 150 years.  Strata of some 60 m are exposed, and the large outcrops are of significant importance to those studying palaeontology or sedimentology, and for studying ancient environments generally.

Biology
The site supports a range of habitats which include unimproved calcareous grassland, woodland and scrub, cliff faces and scree slopes. The grassland is of major importance and it comprises a tall ungrazed sward.  This is dominated by tor-grass, upright brome,  meadow oat-grass, sweet vernal-grass and quaking grass. It is noted for its range of herbs which include salad burnet, common rock-rose, common bird's-foot-trefoil.  The quarry floors support wild thyme, dwarf thistle, yellow-wort and autumn gentian. The site supports many plants which are scarce at a national or county level.  These include fly orchid, musk orchid and purple milk-vetch.  It is one of a small number of sites which support meadow clary in the county.

Shrub areas support nesting birds such as meadow pipit and grasshopper warbler.  It is a shelter area for invertebrates and small mammals.

There are wooded areas of broad-leaved and coniferous trees including mature beech.  These areas support a woodland flora such as ivy broomrape, white helleborine and greater butterfly-orchid.

There is a reported population of adder.

References

SSSI Source
 Natural England SSSI information on the citation
 Natural England SSSI information on the Leckhampton Hill and Charlton Kings Common units

External links
 Natural England (SSSI information)

Sites of Special Scientific Interest in Gloucestershire
Sites of Special Scientific Interest notified in 1954
Cotswolds
Mountains and hills of the United Kingdom with toposcopes
Leckhampton